The Civica Group is an international software business group. It is a privately owned group of companies headquartered in London, UK, and with regional head offices in Australia, Singapore and North America.

History 
Civica was set up through a management buy-out from the Sanderson Group in 1999, backed by venture capitalist group Alchemy Partners and led by Simon Downing who became chief executive. The Civica Group was officially formed from the Sanderson Group in 2002. The group was subsequently listed on the Alternative Investment Market of the London Stock Exchange in 2004. It was delisted in 2008 when it was acquired by 3i for £190 million.

In September 2009 Civica acquired in4tek, a community health and social care record software specialist based in Altrincham.

In April 2011 Civica UK, a wholly owned subsidiary of Civica Group, acquired specialized document and records management services provider Cave Tab. In May 2011 it acquired PSCAL, a financial management software and services provider for the NHS.

In June 2012 Civica acquired Gateway Computing Ltd, publisher of WinDIP Enterprise, a document and records management software suite.

In 2013 Civica acquired Corero Business Systems, an educational software provider.

In 2014 Civica acquired both Coldharbour Systems, a software provider, and Healthcare and Keystone Asset Management, an asset management specialist for the Housing market. Also, in 2014 Civica acquired Asidua, a local government contact management and application specialist and telecoms specialist.

In 2016 Civica acquired Norwel Legal and IPL Information Processing Limited. 

In 2016 Civica also acquired government digital specialist SFW LTD. 
 through which Civica transformed SFW India Pvt LTD. to Civica offshore resourcing center in Vadodara, India.

In December 2016 Civica acquired Abritas a social housing software developer and service provider based in Reading, Berkshire 

It was sold to Partners Group in July 2017 for £1.06 billion. At that point it had about 3,700 staff.

In 2017 Civica was awarded the Civic Compliance contract for the State Government of Victoria for both enforcement and Customer Service.

Operations 
Civica offers services across the following markets:

Local Government
Social housing
Parking enforcement & public protection
Libraries and education
Mobile fleet and asset management
Public protection
Pension administration
Health and Social Care
Legal

Local Government 
Civica provides specialist systems and outsourcing services to local authorities and their partners in the UK, Europe and Australia. Services offered include electronic document management (EDM) systems, parking infrastructure, IT infrastructure, and E-payments systems. The group works with 94% of UK local authorities as well as police forces in England and Wales.

Its systems manage £4 billion of local revenues and £1 billion in secure electronic transactions per year on behalf of local authorities including Manchester City Council, Sunderland City Council, Hammersmith and Fulham, Enfield and Haringey.

Social housing 
Civica supplies housing management and data systems to housing development agencies with a focus on automating business processes. Around one million social housing properties are managed through Civica systems.

Enforcement 
Civica supplies Automatic Number Plate Recognition (ANPR) to UK police forces as well as retail centres, hospitals and other commercial premises. The group also provides anti-social behaviour reporting systems for 170 local authorities.

Education and libraries 
Civica provides software and IT services to education and learning services, including shared learning environments, library management services, and software licensing frameworks. The group also provides IT services including virtual learning environments (VLE) for schools in Sheffield and Luton under the Building Schools for the Future (BSF) program. Civica currently supplies around 50 UK universities.

Through its SPYDUS software, Civica supplies libraries with automated stock ordering, lending and tracking systems including remote access to library catalogues. Civica manages the library systems for the Government of Singapore's Future Schools initiative. In the UK, Civica provides library services for the eleven libraries that are members of the South East Library Management Services (SELMS) consortium. In total, the group manages over 1,500 libraries worldwide.

Mobile fleet and asset management 
Civica has supplied asset and fleet management services for 25 years. The company currently services around 500 customers including around 100 local authorities. Civica offers Tranman fleet software to local government, enterprises and the emergency services. It won Fleet Excellence awards in 2003, 2004, 2005 and 2006 as well as a Green Fleet award in 2006 for its use.

External links 
https://web.archive.org/web/20101127064512/http://www.guardianpublic.co.uk/civca-survey-council-managers Civica conference coverage,The Guardian
https://web.archive.org/web/20101127234310/http://www.guardianpublic.co.uk/public-private-sector-partnerships Civica Chief Executive Simon Downing discusses public-private partnerships, The Guardian
https://web.archive.org/web/20101214141917/http://www.civicaplc.com/NR/rdonlyres/2E6C2C25-581F-45FF-8078-4075386FE54E/1725/CivicaBrochure.pdf Civica service brochure
https://web.archive.org/web/20110722194851/http://www.localgov.co.uk/index.cfm?method=news.detail&id=66168 Civica company profile, Localgov.co.uk

References 

Outsourcing companies